We from the Urals is a 1943 Soviet drama film directed by Lev Kuleshov and Aleksandra Khokhlova.

Plot 
Two teenagers working after school in a large military factory in the Urals rush to the front lines of war, where a nurse has left the sister of one of them. Their everyday life, love and youth make up the plot of the film.

Cast
 Aleksey Konsovsky as Kuzya Zavarin
 Aleksandr Mikhailov as Vanya Tomakurov
 Yanina Zhejmo as Vera Zavarina
 Georgy Millyar as grandfather Tomakurov
 Gleb Florinsky as Major Ignatyev
 Maria Vinogradova as Sonya
 Mariya Barabanova as Kapa Khorkova
 Pyotr Galadzhev as factory painter
 Nikolai Grabbe as Pavka Drozdov
 Sergey Komarov as Yuri Pavlovich
 Sergey Martinson as Head of the dancing group	
 Lidiya Sukharevskaya as Maria Vasilyevna
 Sergey Filippov as Andrei Stepanovich
 Ivan Ryzhov as Ivan Dmitriyevich (uncredited)

External links

1943 drama films
1943 films
Films directed by Lev Kuleshov
Gorky Film Studio films
Soviet black-and-white films
Soviet drama films